Morgan Pridy (born October 9, 1990 in Vancouver, British Columbia) is a Canadian specializing in Super-G and alpine skiing combined. He represented Canada in these event sat the 2014 Winter Olympics. Pridy currently resides in Whistler, British Columbia.

References

1990 births
Living people
Canadian male alpine skiers
Skiers from Vancouver
Alpine skiers at the 2014 Winter Olympics
Olympic alpine skiers of Canada